Graham Ellis (born 6 April 1965) is a physical education teacher and retired Scottish rugby union player who received four caps as hooker.

Early life
Ellis was born in Hawick, Scotland on 6 April 1965. He was educated at Hawick High School.

Rugby Union career

Amateur career

He played for Glasgow Academicals.

He also played club rugby for Jordanhill, Currie and Stewart's Melville.

Provincial career

In August 1989, having already played for Glasgow District, he was selected for Edinburgh District.

International career

In 1995 suffered a biceps muscle rupture ahead of Test match against Western Samoa. Ellis made his international debut against Wales at Murrayfield 18 January 1997. His last appearance against at France in Paris March 1997 having played all four games in the 1997 Five Nations Championship.

In April 1998 his contract was not renewed by the Scottish Rugby Union, despite having been one of Scotland's unused replacements for the Calcutta cup match a month before.

Coaching career

He went on to coach Stewart's Melville FP.

Teaching career
Ellis worked as a PE teacher at Daniel Stewart's and Melville College. He later worked at Castle Manor Academy, a co-educational school in Suffolk.

References

External links
 profile on ESPN

1965 births
Living people
Rugby union hookers
Scotland international rugby union players
People educated at Hawick High School
Scottish schoolteachers